The 1979 Florida Federal Open was a women's singles tennis tournament played on outdoor hard courts at East Lake Woodlands Country Club in Oldsmar, Florida in the United States. The event was part of the AAA category of the 1979 Colgate Series. It was the seventh edition of the tournament and was held from October 22 through October 28, 1979. Third-seeded Evonne Goolagong Cawley won the title, defeating defending champion Virginia Wade in the final, and earned $20,000 first-prize money.

Finals

Singles
 Evonne Goolagong Cawley defeated  Virginia Wade 6–0, 6–3
It was Goolagong Cawley's 4th title of the year and the 81st of her career.

Doubles
 Anne Smith /  Virginia Ruzici defeated  Ilana Kloss /  Betty-Ann Stuart 7–5, 4–6, 7–5

Prize money

Notes

References

External links
 International Tennis Federation (ITF) tournament event details
  Women's Tennis Association (WTA) tournament event details

Florida Federal Open
Eckerd Open
Florida Federal Open
Florida Federal Open
Florida Federal Open